Addis Ketema (meaning "new city") is a district of Addis Ababa, Ethiopia. As of 2011 its population was 271,664.

Geography
The district is located in the northwestern area of the city, not far from its centre. It borders with the districts of Gullele in the north, Arada in the east, Lideta in the south and Kolfe Keranio in the west. Addis Mercato, Africa's largest open-air marketplace, is in Addis Ketema.

List of places
 Ammanuel Area
 American Gibi
 Ched Tera
 Doro Tera
 Korech Tera
 Mesob Tera
 Minalesh Tera
 Aserasement
 Autobus Tera
 Bomb Tera
 Chid Tera
 District 3
 Dubai Tera
 Ferash Tera
 Goma Tera
 Hadere Sefer
 Kolfe Tiwan
 Mentaf Tera
 Mesalemiya
 Military Tera
 Minalesh Tera
 Quasmeda
 Satin Tera
 Sebategna
 Sehan Tera
 Shanta Tera
 Shekla Tera
 Shema Tera
 Shera Tera
 Worik Twra

References

External links

Districts of Addis Ababa